European route E 671 is a road part of the International E-road network. It begins in Timișoara, Timiș County, Romania and ends in Satu Mare.

Route 
 
 : Timișoara–Arad
 : Arad–Oradea
 : Oradea–Satu Mare

External links 
 UN Economic Commission for Europe: Overall Map of E-road Network (2007)
 International E-road network

699671
E671